Cranswick may refer to:

 Cranswick plc, British food producer
 Geoffrey Cranswick (1894–1978), Australian bishop
 George Cranswick (1882–1954), Australian bishop
 Hutton Cranswick, civil parish in Yorkshire, England containing the former village of Cranswick